Thelypteris ovata, the ovate marsh fern or ovate maiden fern, is a species of fern in the Thelypteridaceae family.  Native to the southeastern United States, in Georgia it can be found in the Coastal Plain.

References

Thelypteridaceae
Ferns of the United States
Plants described in 1938